The 12565 / 12566 Bihar Sampark Kranti Express is an Indian daily Sampark Kranti train service of Indian Railways, which runs between the Indian cities of Darbhanga and New Delhi via , , , , , , India.

It operates as train number 12565 from Darbhanga Junction to New Delhi and as train number 12566 in the reverse direction. It is the most important train in North Bihar with Vaishali Express for New Delhi. The other Superfast train which runs via Darbhanga to New Delhi is the 12561/12562 Swatantra Senani Superfast Express.

Coaches

The 12565/12566 Bihar Sampark Kranti Superfast Express presently has 1 AC 1st Class, 2 AC 2 tier, 3 AC 3 tier, 9 Sleeper class, 3 General Unreserved coaches & 1 Pantry car.

As with most train services in India, coach composition may be amended at the discretion of Indian Railways depending on demand.

Aug 24th, the train coaches were painted in Maithili art.

In April 2019 the train ran for the first time between Darbhanga and new Delhi with new LHB coach.

Service

The 12565 Bihar Sampark Kranti Superfast Express covers the distance of 1164 kilometres in 21 hours (55.42 km/h) & 1164 kilometres in 21 hours 12566 Bihar Sampark Kranti Superfast Express (55.42 km/h). As the average speed of the train is more than 55 km/h, a Superfast surcharge is applied.

Route & halts

The train runs from

Loco link
It is hauled by a Kanpur-based WAP-7 from NDLS to DBG and vice versa end to end.

References

External links
https://indiarailinfo.com/train/202/664/1005 India Rail Info
  Times of India
  Times of India

Transport in Delhi
Transport in Darbhanga
Sampark Kranti Express trains
Rail transport in Bihar
Rail transport in Uttar Pradesh
Rail transport in Delhi
Railway services introduced in 2005